Golden EP is the self-released debut EP by Bear Hands.

Track listing

Release history

References

2007 debut EPs
Bear Hands albums